Giacomo Panizza (27 March 1804 – 1 May 1860) was a conductor at La Scala, Milan for 13 years, during which time he composed two operas and thirteen ballets.

Ballets
Teatro alla Scala, Milan 
 16 March 1847 –  (with dances composed by Giovanni Bajetti and Giovanni Corfu), choreography by Jules Perrot.
 12 February 1848 – Faust (with dances composed by Giovanni Bajetti), choreography by Jules Perrot.

External links
 http://www.clarinet.demon.co.uk/panizza.htm 
 http://www.prestoclassical.co.uk/c/Panizza%252C%2BG

Italian male classical composers
Italian classical composers
Italian ballet composers
Italian opera composers
Male opera composers
Italian conductors (music)
Italian male conductors (music)
1804 births
1860 deaths
19th-century classical composers
19th-century conductors (music)
19th-century Italian composers
People from Castellazzo Bormida